Udea chalcophanes is a moth of the family Crambidae. It is endemic to the Hawaiian islands of Oahu, Maui and Hawaii.

The larvae feed on the leaves of Touchardia latifolia.

External links

Moths described in 1899
Endemic moths of Hawaii
chalcophanes